Tunku Iskandar Abdul Jalil Abu Bakar Ibrahim ibni Tunku Ismail (born 14 October 2017) is the Raja Muda (Deputy Crown Prince) of Johor, first son and second child of the current Tunku Mahkota (Crown Prince) of Johor, Tunku Ismail ibni Sultan Ibrahim and his wife, Che' Puan Besar Khaleeda Bustamam. As his father is the heir apparent, upon his birth, Tunku Iskandar become second in line of succession to the throne of Johor. He is the eldest grandson of the current Sultan of Johor, Sultan Ibrahim ibni Almarhum Sultan Iskandar and his consort Permaisuri Raja Zarith Sofiah. Additionally, he is the great-grandson of Almarhum Sultan Iskandar of Johor and Almarhum Sultan Idris Shah II of Perak.

Birth
Tunku Iskandar was born on 14 October 2017 at the Sultanah Aminah Hospital, Johor Bahru. His birth was announced by the Johor Council of Royal Court president, Dato' Abdul Rahim Ramli who also announced the name given by his grandfather, Sultan Ibrahim ibni Almarhum Sultan Iskandar. His given name was a combination of the names of his late great-grandfather, Sultan Iskandar, his late uncle, Tunku Abdul Jalil, his late fourth great-grandfather, Sultan Abu Bakar and his late third great-grandfather, Sultan Ibrahim.

He is the second child of Tunku Ismail ibni Sultan Ibrahim and his wife, Che' Puan Khaleeda Bustamam. His elder sister, Tunku Khalsom Aminah Sofiah was born on 25 June 2016. His younger brother, Tunku Abu Bakar Ibrahim was born on 17 July 2019. His younger sister, Tunku Zahrah Zarith Aziyah was born on 21 April 2021.

Raja Muda of Johor
He was proclaimed as the Raja Muda of Johor by his grandfather, Sultan Ibrahim ibni Almarhum Sultan Iskandar on 22 November 2018. He is the third Raja Muda of modern Johor. Almarhum Sultan Iskandar was the first titleholder in the House of Temenggong and the second was his own father, Tunku Ismail.

In contrast to the Raja Muda of the states of Kedah, Perak, Perlis & Selangor, who are the heir apparents to their respective monarchies, the title of Raja Muda of Johor is bestowed upon to the heir apparent to the heir apparent of the Sultan of Johor. This tradition started when Almarhum Sultan Iskandar proclaimed his grandson, Tunku Ismail, as the Raja Muda of Johor in 2005. This is most likely inspired by the titles used by King Louis XIV's son and grandson. Dauphin of France was the official title of the heir apparent to the throne of France, but when King Louis XIV's grandson was born, his heir apparent, Louis would be known as the 'Grand Dauphin' while Louis would be known as the 'Petit Dauphin'.

Ancestry

References 

2017 births
Living people
House of Temenggong of Johor
Royal House of Perak
Malaysian people of Malay descent
Malaysian Muslims
Tunku Abdul Rahman
Malaysian people of English descent
Malaysian people of Danish descent
Malaysian people of Chinese descent
Royal children